Sympagus cedrelis is a species of beetle in the family Cerambycidae. It was described by Hovore and Toledo in 2006.

References

Acanthocinini
Beetles described in 2006